HMS Penguin was a six-gun  packet brig built for the Royal Navy during the 1830s.

Description
The ship's tonnage was 360  tons burthen. The Alert class was initially armed with a pair of 6-pounder cannon and four 12-pounder carronades. Later they were equipped with six 32-pounder or eight 18-pounder cannon. The ships had a crew of 44 officers and ratings.

Construction and career
Penguin, the fourth ship of her name to serve in the Royal Navy, was ordered on 14 April 1836, laid down in November 1836 at Pembroke Dockyard, Wales, and launched on 10 April 1838. She was completed on 21 September 1838 at Plymouth Dockyard and commissioned on 24 July of that year.

Notes

References

External links
 

Alert-class brig
1838 ships
Ships built in Pembroke Dock